Alain Penaud (born 19 July 1969) is a French former rugby union player who held the position of fly-half. 

He was known for his vision of the game, his audacity and his ball carrying and played mainly for Brive, where he scored 449 points within 334 games all in all and won the Heineken Cup in 1997. Penaud is widely acknowledged as one of the best Brive players of all time. He later won French Rugby Union Championship (named at that time Élite 1) with Toulouse in 2001. 

He was selected 32 times for the French national team and won the 1997 Five Nations Championship clinching a Grand Slam. His international career was restricted due to his strong personality and the tactical choices of many coaches. He has indeed never been selected for a World Cup, even though his career has covered five tournaments.

His son is French rugby union international Damian Penaud.

Biography
Alain Penaud was born on 19 July 1969 in Juillac, Corrèze. He started rugby for his hometown club US Juillac-Objat, near Brive-la-Gaillarde, at the age of 13 and then moved to Brive three years later. He began to be a regular starter for Brive first-team in the late 1980s and the early 1990s. Alongside Sébastien Carrat, Christophe Lamaison, David Venditti and Sebastien Viars, he formed a formidable back line. He reached the 1995–96 French Rugby Union Championship (named at that time Groupe A) final but lost against Toulouse, and is remembered for captaining the team in winning the Heineken Cup in 1997 against Leicester Tigers and featured in the final the following year against Bath. His first start for France came against Wales in 1992. Penaud has been in and out of the side for France, though still appeared in the 1997 Grand Slam win, including a last-minute victory against England at Twickenham. After a defeat in Brisbane in the summer of 1997, he left the national team, missing the 1999 World Cup. 

He moved to Saracens for the 1998–99 Allied Dunbar Premiership season to replace Michael Lynagh, and scored a try on his debut against Northampton Saints. He scored 66 points within 24 games for Sarries. Despite a three-year contract, he spent only one season across the channel (finishing 3rd in the league), preferring, for family reasons to return to France at Toulouse, where he won 2000–01 Élite 1.  Producing two excellent seasons, Penaud was recalled to the France squad for the 2000 Six Nations.

He then returned to Brive when the club was playing in the second division. He helped them to promotion for the 2003–04 season. He left the club in 2005, after scoring 449 points within 334 games including 263 championship ones, and signed for Lyon as player-coach. Despite his age, he surprised many by becoming one of the best players in the league. He then moved to Stade Français in 2005, lasting only one season.

In 2006–07, he returned to honour his contract as player-coach with Lyon in Pro D2. His last dance was tumultuous, as he received a suspension for 30 days for insulting a referee during a match against Limoges. Penaud retired at the end of the season, after a 20-year elite career.

Personal life
He is the father of another French international, Damian Penaud.

He currently works as CCO of Andros.

Honours

Brive
 Heineken Cup: 1996–97
 Heineken Cup runner-up: 1997–98
 Groupe A runner-up: 1995–96
 Challenge Yves du Manoir: 1996

Toulouse
 Élite 1: 2000–01

France
 Five Nations Championship: 1997 (Grand Slam)
 Five Nations Championship/Six Nations Championship runner-up: 1992, 2000

Statistics

Club statistics

International statistics

International tries

References

External links
 EPCR
 ESPN
 FFR
 It's Rugby

CA Brive players
Saracens F.C. players
Stade Toulousain players
Lyon OU players
Stade Français players
French rugby union players
Living people
France international rugby union players
1969 births
Sportspeople from Corrèze
Rugby union fly-halves